Alexandru Mățel (born 17 October 1989) is a Romanian former professional footballer who played mainly as a right back.

He began his career at Farul Constanța, and after a loan spell for Delta Tulcea he joined Astra Giurgiu, with which he recorded his European competitions debut. In 2015, Mățel transferred to Dinamo Zagreb, winning five domestic trophies with the Croatian team. Four years later, he returned to his native country by signing with Hermannstadt. On 2 September 2019 he signed for Universitatea Craiova

Mățel made his full debut for Romania in 2011, and was selected in the nation's UEFA Euro 2016 squad.

Club career

Dinamo Zagreb 
In January 2015, Mățel signed a -year contract with Croatian champions Dinamo Zagreb. He made his debut for the club on 7 February 2015 in a 2–1 victory against Lokomotiva Zagreb and played 13 matches in the 2014–15 season as Dinamo secured both the league title and the cup.

FC Hermannstadt 
On 9 February 2019 he signed a contract with Liga I side FC Hermannstadt.

Universitatea Craiova 
On 2 September 2019 he signed a contract with Liga I side Universitatea Craiova for 1 year with an option for another 2 years

International career
On 2 September 2011, Mățel made his senior debut for Romania in a UEFA Euro 2012 qualification match against Luxembourg, playing the full 90 minutes.

International stats

Honours

Club
Astra Giurgiu
 Cupa României: 2013–14
 Supercupa României: 2014

Dinamo Zagreb
 1. HNL: 2014–15, 2015–16, 2017–18
 Croatian Cup: 2014–15, 2015–16, 2016–17, 2017–18

References

External links

Sportspeople from Constanța
1989 births
Living people
Association football defenders
Romanian footballers
Romania under-21 international footballers
Romania international footballers
UEFA Euro 2016 players
FCV Farul Constanța players
FC Delta Dobrogea Tulcea players
FC Astra Giurgiu players
GNK Dinamo Zagreb players
CS Universitatea Craiova players
FC Hermannstadt players
Liga I players
Liga II players
Croatian Football League players
Romanian expatriate footballers
Romanian expatriate sportspeople in Croatia
Expatriate footballers in Croatia